Edmund Bailey O'Callaghan, (probably 27 February 1797 – 29 May 1880) was an Irish doctor and journalist.

Career 
Born in Mallow, County Cork, Ireland, he studied medicine in Paris and immigrated to Lower Canada in 1823 where he became involved in the political reform movement of the Parti patriote. He was registered to practice medicine in Lower Canada on 16 October 1827.

On the death of Daniel Tracey, owner of the Montreal Vindicator newspaper, in 1832 O'Callaghan became the editor and brought in Thomas Storrow Brown to work on the paper. They proved to be an irreducible adversary of Lord Gosford and the status quo. In 1834, O'Callaghan was elected to the Legislative Assembly of Lower Canada for Yamaska. In office, he was a close supporter of Louis Joseph Papineau.

In 1837, during the Lower Canada Rebellion, a mandate of arrest was issued against him, and he sought refuge at Saint-Denis, then crossed the United States border with his friend, Louis-Joseph Papineau. Later, O'Callaghan became secretary-archivist of the State of New York, and died there in 1880.

Works

  (online). .
 
 
 
 
 Jesuit Relations of Discoveries and Other Occurrences in Canada and the Northern and Western States of the Union, 1632–1672, New York, 1847
 
 A list of Editions of the Holy Scriptures, and Parts Thereof, Printed in America Previous to 1860, Albany, 1861.
 The Register of New Netherland ; 1626 to 1674, Albany, 1865.

Notes

References 
 
 
 John T. Driscoll. "Edmund Bailey O'Callaghan", in New Advent Catholic Encyclopedia, 1911
 Maureen Slattery. "Irish Radicalism and the Roman Catholic Church in Quebec and Ireland, 1833–1834: O'Callaghan and O'Connell Compared", in Canadian Catholic Historical Association, Historical Studies, 63 (1997), pp. 29–58
 Maureen Slattery Durley. "Dr. Edmund Bailey O'Callaghan, His Early Years in Medicine, Montreal, 1823–1828", in Canadian Catholic Historical Association, Study Sessions, 47 (1980), pp. 23–40
 Jack Verney. O'Callaghan. The Making and Unmaking of a Rebel, Montréal: McGill-Queen's Press, 1994, 350 pages  (online excerpt)
 Edward W. Nash. Catalogue of the Library of the Late E. B. O'Callaghan, M. D., LL. D., Historian of New York, New York: Douglas Taylor Printer, 1882 (on line)

See also
Timeline of Quebec history
Lower Canada

1797 births
1880 deaths
19th-century Irish people
Members of the Legislative Assembly of Lower Canada
Journalists from Quebec
Quebec people of Irish descent
People from County Cork
Irish emigrants to pre-Confederation Quebec